Pacific Time was a weekly radio program that covered a wide range of Asian American, East Asian and Southeast Asian issues, including economics, language, politics, public policy, business, the arts and sports.  With news bureaus in Bangkok, Beijing, and Tokyo, it was the only public radio program devoted to Asian-American issues.

Produced by KQED in San Francisco, California, the show was syndicated by as many as 37 other public radio stations in markets around the United States.  The show premiered in 2000 and was hosted by Nguyen Qui Duc until September, 2006, when Nguyen returned to Vietnam. After Nguyen's departure it was hosted by K. Oanh Ha.  Citing financial difficulties, KQED cancelled the show and its last broadcast was October 11, 2007.  At the time it was cancelled the program cost $500,000 per year to produce and had a weekly audience of 190,000.

Stations
Stations carrying Pacific Time:

References

External links
Pacific Time Official website

American public radio programs
Mass media in the San Francisco Bay Area

2000 radio programme debuts 
2007 radio programme endings